Plicisyrinx plicata is a species of sea snail, a marine gastropod mollusk in the family Pseudomelatomidae, the turrids and allies.

Description

Distribution
This marine species occurs off Japan.

References

 Okutani, Takashi. "Report of the archibenthal and abyssal Mollusca mainly collected from Sagami Bay and adjacent waters by the RV Soyo-Maru during the year 1955-1963." Jour. Fac. Sci., Univ. Tokyo, Sec. 2 (1964): 371-447.

External links
 

plicata
Gastropods described in 1964